The following elections occurred in the year 1806.

North America

United States
 United States House of Representatives elections in New York, 1806
 1806 and 1807 United States House of Representatives elections
 1806 and 1807 United States Senate elections

Europe

United Kingdom
 1806 United Kingdom general election

See also
 :Category:1806 elections

1806
LIsts
Elections